The 2022 FIBA Women's Melanesia Basketball Cup was an international basketball tournament contested by national teams of Melanesia sub-zone of FIBA Oceania. The tournament was hosted by Fiji. Originally slated to be held in 2021, the schedule was pushed further to April 2022 due to COVID-19 pandemic, with exact dates has been set to October 26 to 29. Matches were played at the Vodafone Arena in Suva.

The competition served as the sub-regional qualification phase for the basketball event of the 2023 Pacific Games in Solomon Islands with two berths allocated in this tournament, which serves as the official qualifier to the FIBA Asia Cup Pre-Qualifiers.

Hosts  thrashed the defending titlists  in the championship, 71-58, to notch their maiden title. Both finalists, along with next year's hosts , will represent Melanesia in the women's basketball tournament of the 2023 Pacific Games.

Teams
The following national teams participated in the competition.

 (Host)

Preliminary round

Final round

Bronze medal match

Gold medal match

Final standings

Awards

 All-Star Team:
  Marca Muri
  Adeline Souque
  Letava Whippy
  Betty Angula
  Matila Vocea

References

Melanesian Basketball Cup, 2022
International sports competitions hosted by Fiji